Afonso II of Kongo and Nkondo was a ruler of the kingdom of Kongo in the period following the Kongo Civil War. He was a member of the House of Kimpanzu and may have been supported in his claim for the throne by partisans in Soyo. He took the throne in November 1665 in the first of a series of power grabs for the throne of the kingdom.

Overthrow and exile
The House of Kinlaza, which had held the throne of Kongo for the last three decades, acted swiftly to remove their rivals from power. King Afonso II was deposed only a month into his term in December 1665. In place of Afonso II, the Kinlaza put Álvaro VII in power. The deposed king was forced to flee into the mountains of Nkondo where he ruled in opposition to the Kinlaza partisans in Kongo. He ruled Nkondo until his death in 1669.

See also
List of Manikongo of Kongo
Kingdom of Kongo
House of Kimpanzu
House of Kinlaza

17th-century births
1669 deaths
Manikongo of Kongo
17th-century African people